Damir Rilje (born 9 May 1958) is a Croatian politician. A member of the Social Democratic Party of Croatia, he is the current mayor of Trogir and a member of the 7th assembly of the Croatian Parliament.

References

Social Democratic Party of Croatia politicians
Representatives in the modern Croatian Parliament
1958 births
Living people
Place of birth missing (living people)